La Banda is a city in the province of Santiago del Estero, Argentina

La Banda may also refer to:

La Banda de Shilcayo District, one of fourteen districts of the province San Martín in Peru
La Banda (TV series), a Spanish-language singing competition series created by Ricky Martin and Simon Cowell, and produced by Ricky Martin

See also
La Banda del Golden Rocket, a 1991 Argentine TV series
NG La Banda, a Cuban musical group founded by flutist José Luis "El Tosco" Cortés
Banda (disambiguation)